The Massive Range is a mountain range of the Canadian Rockies, located in the southwestern area of the Bow River valley in Banff National Park, Canada.

This range includes the following mountains and peaks:

Geology 
The rock layers on the western side of the Sawback Range dip below the Bow River valley and rise again on the western side under Massive Mountain. Pilot Mountain, Mt. Brett and Mt. Bourgeau are peaks in another block of Palaeozoic rocks thrust from the west over slightly younger rocks of the Massive Range.

References

Further reading

 
 

Mountain ranges of Alberta
Ranges of the Canadian Rockies
Mountains of Banff National Park